SS Orcades can refer to:

Ship names